Mahasu Pahari is a Western Pahari (Himachali,) language spoken in Himachal Pradesh. It is also known as Mahasui or Mahasuvi. The speaking population is about 1,000,000 (2001). It is more commonly spoken in the Himachal Pradesh, Shimla (Simla) and Solan districts. It is to be known that Shimla and Solan were parts of the old Mahasu district. Himachal Pradesh State on 1 September, 1972 reorganised the districts dissolving Mahasu district. The Solan district was carved out of Solan and Arki tehsils of the then Mahasu district and tehsils of Kandaghat and Nalagarh of the then Shimla District of Punjab.

Area 

According to different locations, the language has developed several dialects. Lower Mahasu Pahari (Baghati, Baghliani, Kiunthali), Upper Mahasu Pahari (Rampuri, Rohruri, Nawari, Jubbali, Shimla Siraji, Sodochi). The Kiunthali variety appears to be understood by others, and their attitude toward it is favorable. Rampuri is also called Kochi; Rohruri is also called Soracholi and Sodochi spoken in Kotgarh. Intelligibility among dialects is above 85%. Lexical similarity is 74%–82% with upper dialects, and 74%–95% with lower dialects. The language is used in home and for religious purposes. It is understood and spoken from people of vital age group. The educated are more proficient in Hindi and English. It is considered to be highly endangered as the number of people speaking it is constantly going down. It is closely related to Sirmauri and to Jaunsari.

Script 
The native script of the language is a variety of Takri Script. There are some written records of the language in Takri script and Nastaliq script but nowadays Devanagari script is usually used.

Phonology

Consonants 

 Sounds [tsʰ bʱ dʱ] are only seldom heard among dialects.
 Allophones of /b d ɡ/ are heard as [b̥ d̥ ɡ̊] in word-final position.
 [tʃʰ] occurs from Hindi loanwords.
 [ʒ] can be heard as allophone of /dʒ/.
 [ŋ] is heard when a nasal occurs before velar stops.
 /ɦ/ may also be heard as a voiceless [h] among dialects.
 [j, w] are mainly heard after vowels. [w] can also be an allophone of /ʋ/.

Vowels 

 A short /u/ may also have an allophone of a near-close sound [ʊ].
[ə] is mainly heard as an allophone of /ɑ/. /ɑ/ can also be heard as an open mid sound [ʌ].

Status 
The language is commonly called Pahari or Himachali. The language has no official status and is recorded as dialect of Hindi. According to the United Nations Education, Scientific and Cultural Organisation (UNESCO), the language is of definitely endangered category, i.e. many Mahasui children are not learning Mahasui as their mother tongue any longer. Earlier, the language had state patronage. Everything changed since independence, due to favoritism towards Hindi by the Indian Government.

The demand for the inclusion of 'Pahari (Himachali)' under the Eight Schedule of the Constitution, which is supposed to represent multiple Pahari languages of Himachal Pradesh, had been made in the year 2010 by the state's Vidhan Sabha. There has been no positive progress on this matter since then even when small organisations strive to save the language and demand it. Due to political interest, the language is currently recorded as a dialect of Hindi, even when having a poor mutual intelligibility with it.

References

External links
 
 
 
Map of Western Pahari languages from Grierson's early 20th-century Linguistic Survey of India

Indo-Aryan languages
Northern Indo-Aryan languages
Languages of Himachal Pradesh
Endangered languages of India